Mount Randy Morgenson is a  mountain summit located along the crest of the Sierra Nevada mountain range in Tulare County, California. It is situated in Sequoia National Park, one mile north-northwest of Mount Whitney, 0.85 mile east of Mount Hale, and one-half mile west of Mount Russell, the nearest higher neighbor. The John Muir Trail traverses to the south of the mountain, providing an approach option. Mt. Morgenson ranks as the 20th-highest summit in California.

History
This mountain's name honors esteemed park ranger James Randall "Randy" Morgenson (1945–1996), who vanished in July 1996 while on patrol in Sequoia-Kings Canyon National Park. Despite one of the most intense search-and-rescue operations in National Park Service history, his body wasn't found until five years later. This peak's unofficial name has not been adopted by the U. S. Board on Geographic Names and so it does not appear on USGS maps. Instead, Mount Randy Morgenson is labeled "Peak 4245 m (13,920+ ft)" on USGS maps.

The first ascent of the summit was made June 27, 1926, by Norman Clyde, who is credited with 130 first ascents, most of which were in the Sierra Nevada.

Climate
Mount Randy Morgenson is located in an alpine climate zone. Most weather fronts originate in the Pacific Ocean, and travel east toward the Sierra Nevada mountains. As fronts approach, they are forced upward by the peaks (orographic lift), causing them to drop their moisture in the form of rain or snowfall onto the range. Precipitation runoff from this mountain drains west to the Kern River via Wallace and Whitney Creeks.

Gallery

See also

 List of the major 4000-meter summits of California

References

External links
 Weather forecast: National Weather Service
 Randy Morgenson photo: Backpacker.com

Mountains of Tulare County, California
Mountains of Sequoia National Park
North American 4000 m summits
Mountains of Northern California
Sierra Nevada (United States)